Matt Reid (born June 19, 1978) is an American college baseball coach and former player. He currently serves as an assistant coach for the Florida Gulf Coast Eagles baseball team. He has also served as the head coach of the Army Black Knights baseball program. He was named to that position on an interim basis prior to the 2014 season; Army made him its full-time head coach following the season. Reid is the son of American football coach Jim Reid.

Reid played college baseball at Richmond, where he lettered all four years, batted .113, and served as team captain in his senior season. He began his coaching career at VMI, then worked with infielders at Louisburg. He then as an assistant coach at VCU, where he completed a master's degree in Sport Leadership.  Reid then spent a season with Old Dominion before two seasons at UNC Asheville. Reid joined Army's staff in 2008, and added associate head coach duties in 2011.  Head coach Joe Sottolano was removed of duties for suspected misconduct after the 2013 season, and Reid was elevated to head coach.  He served as interim head coach for the 2014 season and took over on a full-time basis in 2015.

Head coaching record
Below is a table of Reid's yearly records as an NCAA head baseball coach.

References

Living people
Sportspeople from Amherst, Massachusetts
Army Black Knights baseball coaches
Florida Gulf Coast Eagles baseball coaches
Louisburg Hurricanes baseball coaches
Old Dominion Monarchs baseball coaches
Richmond Spiders baseball players
UNC Asheville Bulldogs baseball coaches
VCU Rams baseball coaches
Virginia Commonwealth University alumni
VMI Keydets baseball coaches
1978 births